Ahmed Wahid Chouih (born February 10, 1982) is an Algerian football player who is currently playing as a goalkeeper for RC Arbaâ in the Algerian Ligue Professionnelle 2.

Club career
Originally signed as a backup to starting goalkeeper Mohamed Amine Zemmamouche, he has started 19 games out of 24 this season replacing the injured Zemmamouche.

External links
 
 USM-Alger Profile

1982 births
Algerian footballers
Living people
Footballers from Algiers
USM Alger players
USM El Harrach players
Algerian Ligue Professionnelle 1 players
Algerian Ligue 2 players
MC Saïda players
JSM Béjaïa players
MO Constantine players
Association football goalkeepers
21st-century Algerian people